Cloyne Cathedral may refer to either the cathedral church of the Diocese of Cloyne in the Church of Ireland or in the Roman Catholic Church. The former is situated in the village of Cloyne, County Cork in Ireland while the latter is situated 23km away by road in the town of Cobh on Great Island. See
Cloyne Cathedral for the Church of Ireland cathedral
St Colman’s cathedral, Cobh for the Roman Catholic Church cathedral

See also
Diocese of Cork, Cloyne and Ross in the Church of Ireland
Roman Catholic Diocese of Cloyne